6th OTO Awards

Expo Aréna, Bratislava, Slovakia

Overall winner  Maroš Kramár

Hall of Fame  Pavol Mikulík

EuroTelevízia Award  V politike

◄ 5th | 7th ►

The 6th OTO Awards, honoring the best in Slovak popular culture for the year 2005, took time and place on February 8, 2006, at the Incheba's Expo Aréna hall in Bratislava. The ceremony broadcast live STV. The host of the show was Karel Gott.

Performers
 Peter Dvorský, opera singer
 Elán, band
 Karel Gott, singer
 Melánia Kasenčáková and Ján Mečoch (alias Lady Mel & Johnny Perfekto), dancers
 Dara Rolins and Tina, singers
 Miroslav Žbirka, singer

Winners and nominees

Main categories
 Television

 Music

Others

Superlatives

Multiple nominees
 2 nominations
 S.O.S. – STV

References

External links
 Archive > OTO 2005 – 6th edition  (Official website)
 OTO 2005 – 6th edition (Official website - old)

06
2005 in Slovak music
2005 in Slovak television
2005 television awards